Asenathi Jim (born 26 January 1992 in Cape Town) is a South African sailor, who specialized in two-person dinghy (470) class. He represented South Africa, along with his personal coach and partner Roger Hudson, at the 2012 Summer Olympics, and has also been training throughout most of his sporting career for RaceAhead Yacht Club. As of June 2015, Jim is ranked twentieth in the world for the two-person dinghy class by the International Sailing Federation, despite of his remarkable triumphs at the 2014 Delta Lloyd Regatta in Medemblik, Netherlands.

Jim qualified for the South African squad in the men's 470 class at the 2012 Summer Olympics in London by having achieved a berth and finishing thirty-second from the World Championships in Barcelona, Spain. Teaming up with his personal coach and partner Hudson in the opening series, the South African duo were left trailing in the penultimate position out of twenty-seven boats after ten races with an accumulated net score of 194 points.

References

External links
 
 
 
 NBC 2012 Olympics profile

1992 births
Living people
South African male sailors (sport)
Olympic sailors of South Africa
Sailors at the 2012 Summer Olympics – 470
Sailors at the 2016 Summer Olympics – 470
Sportspeople from Cape Town